Castellón (officially in ) is a province in the northern part of the Valencian Community. It is bordered by the provinces of Valencia to the south, Teruel to the west, Tarragona to the north, and by the Mediterranean Sea to the east. The western side of the province is in the mountainous Sistema Ibérico area.

Geography
Castellón's capital is Castellón de la Plana. The province had a population of 579,962 at the start of 2019, 30% of whom were residing in the capital, 60% in its metropolitan area, and 85% along the coastline. As of the 2011 Census, the population had grown to 594,423 people, but has since declined. The province, and in particular its idle large airport, has become a symbol of the wasteful spending prior to the 2008-14 Spanish financial crisis.

It is a bilingual territory whose inhabitants speak both Spanish and the local co-official language Valencian.

Other major cities of the province include Vila-real, Borriana, La Vall d'Uixó and Vinaròs. There are 135 municipalities in Castellón; see List of municipalities in Castellón.

Castellón is the home of Penyagolosa, the highest mountain of the province and the second highest one in the Valencian Community. It is widely considered to be one of the most emblematic Valencian mountains.

The Greenwich Meridian (the Prime Meridian) passes through the province; there are localities with commemorative monuments such as La Pobla Tornesa, Castellón or Almassora (Paseo Marítimo), and in Castellon it intersects the 40th parallel, and the exact point can be visited at the Meridian Park.

Population development
The historical population is given in the following chart:

Economy

Traditionally, the economy of Castellón has been focused on the production of citrus and vegetables (Nules and Benicarló). Since the 17th century, Castellón has developed an important ceramic and ceramic tile industry (Onda, L'Alcora, Nules, Castellón de la Plana and Vila-real) and nowadays most of the Spanish tile producers are concentrated in the province. Also, furniture (Benicarló and Vinaròs) and chemical industries (Benicarló and Castellón) are present. There is a large oil refinery in Castellón de la Plana.

Traditional industries such as shoe and footwear (La Vall d'Uixó), fishing (Castellón, Vinaròs) and textiles (Vilafranca and Morella), have given way to a service-based economy due to the increasing importance of tourism in the economy of the province.

Tourism
The Province of Castellón has varied landscapes and heritage that supports a growing tourist industry. The largest seaside and beach resorts include Benicàssim, Orpesa, Vinaròs, Borriana, Peníscola, Benicarló, etc. There are opportunities for rural tourism in the interior, as well as monumental towns like Morella, Vilafamés, Sant Mateu, Segorbe, mineral springs at Montanejos, Benassal, Catí, etc.

More than 50% of the hotel beds are concentrated in Peniscola, which is the third most popular tourist destination in the Valencian Community after Benidorm and Valencia.

Comarques

The province is historically subdivided into the following comarques:

 Alcalatén
 Alt Maestrat
 Alto Mijares
 Alto Palancia
 Baix Maestrat
 Plana Alta
 Plana Baixa
 Ports

Notes

References

External links

.   Meridian Park